The Nouveau Stade de Bordeaux, currently also known as the Matmut Atlantique for sponsorship purposes, is a football stadium in Bordeaux, France. It is the home of Ligue 2 club FC Girondins de Bordeaux and seats 42,115 spectators.

History
Construction began in November 2012 and ended in April 2015. The stadium was inaugurated on 18 May 2015. The first match was Bordeaux against Montpellier on 23 May 2015, the final day of the league season. The hosts won 2–1, with both goals by Diego Rolan.

The stadium also hosted the semi-finals of the 2014–15 Top 14 season in rugby union, and also hosted five matches in UEFA Euro 2016, including one quarter-final.

On 7 September 2015, it hosted the France national team in a 2–1 friendly win over Serbia. In September 2016, the ground was chosen as the host of the 2018 Coupe de la Ligue Final as part of plans to host the event at various venues outside of Paris.

French-Canadian singer Céline Dion performed the first concert at the stadium on 29 June 2017.

The hard rock band Guns N' Roses performed at the stadium during their Not In This Lifetime...Tour on June 26, 2018.

The stadium was listed as one of six to host football in Paris bid for the 2024 Summer Olympics, which was chosen in July 2017.

In November 2017, after the French bid won, the stadium was confirmed as one of nine to host the 2023 Rugby World Cup.

UEFA Euro 2016 matches

2023 Rugby World Cup matches

Concerts

Gallery

References

External links

Matmut Atlantique

Football venues in France
Sports venues in Bordeaux
FC Girondins de Bordeaux
UEFA Euro 2016 stadiums
Sports venues completed in 2015
Venues of the 2024 Summer Olympics
Olympic football venues
2015 establishments in France
21st-century architecture in France